Frank A. Ciccone III (born October 10, 1947 in Providence, Rhode Island) is an American politician and a Democratic member of the Rhode Island Senate representing District 7 since January 2005. Ciccone served consecutively from January 2003 until January 2005 in the District 3 seat.

Education
Ciccone graduated Hope High School.  He also attended Bryant University.

Elections
2012 Ciccone was unopposed for the September 11, 2012 Democratic Primary, winning with 1,315 votes; returning former state Senator Catherine Graziano ran as an Independent, setting up their fourth contest. Ciccone won the November 6, 2012 General election with 5,049 votes (72.7%) against former Senator Graziano.
2002 With District 3 incumbent Democratic Senator Rhoda Perry redistricted to District 1, Ciccone was unopposed for the September 10, 2002 Democratic Primary, winning with 1,925 votes, and won the November 5, 2002 General election with 3,633 votes (86.2%) against Republican nominee Brian Mayben, who had run for a House seat in 1996 and 1998.
2004 Switching to run in District 7, and with Senator John Celona retiring, Ciccone was challenged in the three-way September 14, 2004 Democratic Primary, winning with 1,667 votes (50.2%), and won the November 2, 2004 General election with 6,758 votes (72.2%) against Republican nominee Philip Stone.
2006 Ciccone was challenged in the September 12, 2006 Democratic Primary, but won with 2,213 votes (60.1%) against former state Senator Catherine Graziano, and won the November 7, 2006 General election with 6,980 votes (81.5%) against Green candidate Scott Hacker.
2008 In a rematch of their 2006 primary, Ciccone was again challenged by former state Senator Graziano in the September 9, 2008 Democratic Primary, and won with 1,114 votes (51.8%); Ciccone won the November 4, 2008 General election with 7,401 votes (77.2%) against Independent candidate Gregary Wright.
2010 Ciccone was unopposed for the September 23, 2010 Democratic Primary, winning with 3,114 votes; former state Senator Graziano ran as an Independent, setting up their third contest. Ciccone won the November 2, 2010 General election with 4,538 votes (59.8%) against Senator Graziano.

References

External links
Official page at the Rhode Island General Assembly
Campaign site

Frank Ciccone at Ballotpedia
Frank A. Ciccone III at the National Institute on Money in State Politics

1947 births
Living people
Bryant University alumni
Harvard Law School alumni
Politicians from Providence, Rhode Island
Democratic Party Rhode Island state senators
21st-century American politicians